Martina Moravcová (born 16 January 1976) is a Slovak medley, butterfly, and freestyle swimmer. She made her international swimming debut in 1991 for Czechoslovakia, and has gone on to compete in five consecutive Summer Olympics (1992–2008). She is a two-time Olympic silver medalist, both achieved at the 2000 Summer Olympics in Sydney, Australia. In the 100-meter butterfly, she finished second to Inge de Bruijn, and in the 200-meter freestyle, she finished eight one-hundredths of a second to home favorite Susie O'Neill.

Early life
Martina Moravcová was born in 1976 in Piešťany. As a child, she liked to go to the swimming pool and swim in Váh river and when she became a young girl, participated in yachting on Sĺňava Lake. In the 1990s she moved to Dallas, Texas where she started attending Southern Methodist University.

Career
In 1999, she was named the NCAA's Women's Swimmer of the Year While at SMU, she won the Honda Sports Award as the nation's top female swimmer in 1999. In 2002 and 2004, she was the top women's winner on FINA's World Cup series. Her 105 gold medals in this competition ranks her second all-time, behind Katinka Hosszú.

In 2014 she became a coach of a Slovak Swimming Camp at which she helped 700 children to achieve their goals.

Currently she is an assistant coach to Steve Collins at the Southern Methodist University and is a mother to two children.

References

External links
 
 
 
 
 

     

1976 births
Living people
Sportspeople from Piešťany
Slovak female swimmers
Czechoslovak female swimmers
Olympic swimmers of Czechoslovakia
Olympic swimmers of Slovakia
Olympic silver medalists for Slovakia
Female medley swimmers
Slovak female freestyle swimmers
Female butterfly swimmers
Swimmers at the 1992 Summer Olympics
Swimmers at the 1996 Summer Olympics
Swimmers at the 2000 Summer Olympics
Swimmers at the 2004 Summer Olympics
Swimmers at the 2008 Summer Olympics
World record setters in swimming
World Aquatics Championships medalists in swimming
Medalists at the FINA World Swimming Championships (25 m)
European Aquatics Championships medalists in swimming
Medalists at the 2000 Summer Olympics
Olympic silver medalists in swimming
Universiade medalists in swimming
Universiade gold medalists for Slovakia
Universiade bronze medalists for Slovakia
SMU Mustangs women's swimmers
Medalists at the 1995 Summer Universiade
Medalists at the 1997 Summer Universiade